Hauknes is a village in the municipality of Rana in Nordland county, Norway. It is a suburb of the town of Mo i Rana, which is located just a few kilometers to the northeast. The village is located on the south side of the Ranfjorden.

References

Rana, Norway
Villages in Nordland